Eurata strigiventris is a moth of the subfamily Arctiinae. It was described by Félix Édouard Guérin-Méneville in 1830. It is found in Brazil and Argentina.

References

 

Arctiinae
Moths described in 1830